Juan Ayuso Pesquera (born 16 September 2002) is a Spanish road cyclist, who currently rides for UCI WorldTeam .

Major results

2019
 National Junior Road Championships
1st  Road race
3rd Time trial
 3rd Gipuzkoa Klasika
 5th Overall Trophée Centre Morbihan
2020
 National Junior Road Championships
1st  Road race
1st  Time trial
 1st Gipuzkoa Klasika
 UEC European Junior Road Championships
5th Time trial
7th Road race
2021
 1st  Overall Giro Ciclistico d'Italia
1st  Points classification
1st  Mountains classification
1st  Young rider classification
1st Stages 2, 5 & 7
 1st  Overall Giro di Romagna
1st Stages 2 & 3
 1st Trofeo Piva
 1st Giro del Belvedere
 2nd Prueba Villafranca de Ordizia
 3rd  Road race, UEC European Under-23 Road Championships
2022
 1st Circuito de Getxo
 2nd Trofeo Laigueglia
 3rd Overall Vuelta a España
 4th Road race, National Road Championships
 4th Overall Tour de Romandie
1st  Young rider classification
 4th La Drôme Classic
 4th Prueba Villafranca de Ordizia
 5th Overall Volta a Catalunya

General classification results timeline
Sources:

References

External links

2002 births
Living people
Spanish male cyclists
Cyclists from Barcelona
21st-century Spanish people